Helicoverpa atacamae, the Chilean corn earworm,  is a moth of the family Noctuidae.

It is endemic to Chile, including the Atacama Region.

atacamae
Moths of South America
Endemic fauna of Chile
Noctuidae of South America
Moths described in 1965